The Shelburne News is an American newspaper serving the town of Shelburne, Vermont. The paper has a circulation of 4,500-5,000. It is a free, weekly paper published on Thursdays. The paper is owned by the Vermont Community Newspaper Group.

Greg Popa is the publisher of the Shelburne News, Tom Kearney is the paper's executive editor, and Lisa Scagliotti is the managing editor.

History 
The paper was first published in 1967.  Lynn Monty replaced Sheri Duff as the paper's editor in July 2015. In 2017, Holly Johnson sold the Shelburne News to Bob Miller and Norb Garret, owners of the Stowe Reporter, Waterbury Record, News & Citizen, and the Citizen. In January 2019, the owners renamed the company to Vermont Community Newspaper Group.

Awards 
Vermont Press Association, 2007 Feature writing (non-daily): Chris Preston, Honorable Mention

References

Newspapers published in Vermont
Weekly newspapers published in the United States
Publications established in 1967
1967 establishments in Vermont
Shelburne, Vermont